The Super League under 19s Academy Championship is a youth branch of the Super League competition in the sport of Rugby League which was operational between 2013 and 2019. Prior to 2013 it was the Under 20s competition and from 2020 it will be under 18s. The under 19s was the premier Super League Youth Academy competition. Wigan featured in every Grand Final winning an impressive 6 out of 7 titles with many players going on to be promoted to the first team.

Clubs

Champions

Source:

See also

References

External links

Super League
Sports leagues established in 2012
2013 establishments in the United Kingdom
Youth sport in the United Kingdom